Shoal Lake 39 First Nation is an Ojibwa or Anishinaabe First Nation, located along the northwestern shores of Shoal Lake, Ontario. It is officially known as Iskatewizaagegan #39 Independent First Nation. The total registered population of this First Nation is 585, of which 297 live on its own reserves. They are governed by a chief and council, with their current Chief Gerald Lewis having been elected in March 2016 for a two-year term.

In April 2008, the chief of Shoal Lake 39 complained that the sewage treatment plant built for the community in 2000 had no running water to help maintain cleanliness, and that other problems with the plant could lead to a complete shut-down, resulting in raw sewage entering the lake from which Winnipeg has been drawing its drinking water for almost 100 years. In June 2009, Chief Mandamin and some community members demonstrated on the Trans-Canada Highway near their home reserve, to show their grievances with a highway-twinning project planned by the Ontario government. They also expressed frustration with the fact that the City of Winnipeg has never made an agreement with Shoal Lake 39 regarding the water that is drawn from Shoal Lake to service Winnipeg citizens, although the adjacent Shoal Lake 40 First Nation did have an agreement settled in 1989.

In 2011, Iskatewizaagegan #39 First Nation voiced its concern over the plans for the City of Winnipeg to sell its water to outlying communities. That water originates in Shoal Lake, near the reserves of this First Nation, and the natives are seeking monetary compensation, or other equivalent forms of redress, for the many hardships they have endured over the years. The water taken out of Shoal Lake for the aqueduct has required artificial maintenance of lake levels, leading to loss of fishing and wild rice resources, among other difficulties arising from the loss of sovereignty over the land and water. The leaders of this #39 band have threatened to cut off the Winnipeg water supply by blocking the aquatic entrance to Shoal Lake. The neighboring Shoal Lake 40 First Nation stated that they were not willing to take such drastic measures in achieving their objectives, before negotiating with various levels of government.

Iskatewizaagegan First Nation has now taken this matter of Winnipeg's water usage to the Manitoba Court of Queen's Bench. In a legal petition filed on 14 March 2012, the First Nation is asking the court to set aside a December 2011 decision by the City of Winnipeg to enter into service-sharing agreements, including one nearing completion with West St. Paul. The Shoal Lake No. 39 band also wants the court to order the city to refrain from any more negotiations until it reaches an agreement with the First Nation on how the water may be used. This First Nation has long maintained Winnipeg did not obtain its consent as far back as 1919, although a neighbouring band, Shoal Lake No. 40, has no such dispute with the city.

Four Reserves are attached to this First Nation. They are:

Agency 30, shared with 12 other First Nations
Shoal Lake 34B2, shared with Shoal Lake 40 First Nation
Shoal Lake 39, partly located in Manitoba adjacent to the north of Shoal Lake
Shoal Lake 39A, northwest of Lake of the Woods

References

External links 
 Map of Shoal Lake 39A (part in Manitoba) at Statcan
 Map of Shoal Lake 39A (part in Ontario) at Statcan
 Map of Shoal Lake 34B2 at Statcan

First Nations governments in Ontario
Saulteaux